Nguyễn Đức Hiền (born 14 November 1925) is a Vietnamese cyclist. He competed in the individual and team road race events at the 1952 Summer Olympics.

References

External links
 

1925 births
People from An Giang Province
Possibly living people
Vietnamese male cyclists
Olympic cyclists of Vietnam
Cyclists at the 1952 Summer Olympics